Ole Falkentorp (18 February 1886 – 21 August 1948) was a Danish architect.

Early life and education
Johannes Oluf Ole Falkentorp was born into a family of architects in Copenhagen. His father was Albert Jensen, architect, professor and Royal Building Inspector, and his mother Sophie Jensen née Nebelong, daughter of the architect Niels Sigfred Nebelong. He adopted the surname to Falkentorp in 1899.

He was enrolled at the Royal Danish Academy of Fine Arts, where Historicism still dominated and his father was a central figure, but left shortly after. Instead he took classes at a technical school and apprenticed as a mason.
He was then articled to Heinrich Wenck, head of the architectural office of the Danish State Railways. There he met Carl Petersen and Povl Baumann with whom he would later collaborate on several projects.

Falkentorp's architectural expression moved from Neoclassicism through Modernism to Functionalism.

Important works, all in Copenhagen, include the housing development Classen Have (1924, with Carl Petersen and Povl Baumann), the copper-clad office building Ved Vesterport  (1930–32, with Povl Baumann) and the Hornbæk Badehotel (1935) and Hotel Astoria (1935) next to Copenhagen Central Station.

In 1911, Falkentorp was a co-founder and dedicated debating member of the alternative architecture association Den Frie Arkitektforening  (now Danske Arkitekters Landsforbundan) .

Gallery

Selected works
  Classens Have  (1924, with Carl Petersen and Povl Baumann)
 Ved Vesterport at Vesterbrogade, Copenhagen (1930–32, with Povl Baumann
 Hotel Astoria, Banegårdspladsen, Copenhagen (1934–35)
 Hornbæk Badehotel, Hornbæk (1934–35)
 Hotel Codan, Sankt Annæ Plads, Copenhagen (1948–50, with Ole Buhl and Harald Petersen)

References

20th-century Danish architects
Architects from Copenhagen
1886 births
1948 deaths
Royal Danish Academy of Fine Arts alumni